Doaa Moussa (born May 1, 1982, in Giza, Giza Governorate, Egypt) is an Egyptian Olympic rower. She represented Egypt in 2004 Summer Olympics in Athena.

Olympic Participation

Athena 2004 
Rowing  – Women's single sculls

References 

1982 births
Egyptian female rowers
Olympic rowers of Egypt
Rowers at the 2004 Summer Olympics
Living people
Sportspeople from Giza
21st-century Egyptian women